Olax zeylanica is a plant species in the family Olacaceae and the type species of the genus Olax. It is found in Bangladesh, India, Myanmar, Sri Lanka, where it is widely used as a leafy vegetable in rural areas. It is known by local people as "මැල්ල - mella" in Sri Lanka.

Ecology
Intermediate forest subcanopy.

Uses
Leaves- vegetable, medicinal.

It is widely used as leafy vegetable and also as remedy for snake bites in Sri Lankan Ayurvedic medicine.

References

 http://journals.sjp.ac.lk/index.php/vjs/article/view/279
 http://www.nsf.ac.lk/newsletter/VOL3NO10/ethno.pdf
 http://environmentlanka.com/blog/2010/olax-zeylanica-an-environmentally-safe-bio-pesticide-for-the-control-of-the-maize-weevil-sitophilus-zeamais-mots-curculionidae/
 http://www.datamillion.com/mplants/Plants%20used%20for%20treatments%20of%20snake%20bites%20in%20Sri%20Lankan%20Ayurveda%20System.pdf
 http://www.theplantlist.org/tpl/record/kew-2399101

Olacaceae
Flora of Sri Lanka